The East Lamma Channel is a sea channel in Hong Kong. It lies between the western shores of Hong Kong Island and Ap Lei Chau, and the east side of Lamma Island. To the north it leads into the Sulphur Channel and Victoria Harbour, to the south into the South China Sea.

The East Lamma Channel is one of the areas in the world with the heaviest traffic with more than 150 deep-water vessels of all kinds passing there every day. The eastern entrance to the channel is also the pilot point for ships going to the Kwai Tsing Container Terminals and for ships passing the Ma Wan water way up to the eastern Pearl River Delta ports in Shenzhen and Guangzhou. The East Lamma Channel is the deepest water entrance to the Hong Kong water area and part of the traffic controlled Ma Wan water way used by nearly all bigger ships coming from the east.

See also 
 West Lamma Channel

Channels of Hong Kong
Lamma Island